The Paton Street Case is a 1955 mystery crime novel by the British writer John Bingham. It was published in New York by Dodd Mead with the alternative title of Inspector Morgan's Dilemma.

Synopsis
Police investigating a suspected arson attack at 127 Paton Street discover a body in the first floor flat.

References

Bibliography
 Reilly, John M. Twentieth Century Crime & Mystery Writers. Springer, 2015.

1955 British novels
British mystery novels
Novels by John Bingham
Victor Gollancz Ltd books